Xylococculus betulae is a species of scale insect.

References

Sternorrhyncha